Andrei Vladimirovich Lutai (born 24 July 1986) is a Russian former competitive figure skater. He is the 2006 Karl Schäfer Memorial champion, 2006 International Cup of Nice champion, and a three-time Russian national medalist (2007 & 2008 silver; 2009 bronze). He placed as high as 5th at the European Championships (2007) and 10th at the World Championships (2009).

Career
Lutai began skating in 1992 and was coached by his sister in his early years. After the rink in Belgorod closed, he moved to Samara for one year, and then to Saint Petersburg in 2001 after his sister asked Alexei Mishin to take him in his group. In summer 2005, he broke his foot which continued to bother him in later years. In August 2009, Mishin said that Lutai was very polite and responsible and that his host families spoke highly of him.

In November 2009, following his 10th-place finish at the 2009 Skate America, Lutai was arrested in Lake Placid, New York and charged with third degree grand larceny and third degree criminal possession of stolen property, both felonies; and third degree unauthorized use of a vehicle and aggravated driving while intoxicated, which are misdemeanors. At a hearing on November 18, Lutai, who had no criminal history, pleaded not guilty to all charges. He was handed a one-year ban by Russia's figure skating governing body which meant he could not compete for a place on the Russian team at the 2010 Winter Olympics. In September 2011, Lutai pleaded guilty to reckless driving and was sentenced to time served.

In early 2010, Lutai became a coach at Albena Denkova / Maxim Staviski's skating club in Sofia, Bulgaria. One of his students is Georgi Kenchadze.

Personal life 
Lutai was born on 24 July 1986 in Belgorod, Russian SFSR. The youngest of three children, he has a sister, Elena Malakhova, a skating coach who is 15 years older, and a brother, Alexander, a manager in a firm who is 9 years older.

In April 2010, Lutai married Bulgarian ice dancer Ina Demireva, sister of World champion Albena Denkova, in Sofia, Bulgaria. Their daughter, Sylvia, was born in September 2010.

Programs

Results 
GP: Grand Prix; JGP: Junior Grand Prix

References

External links 

 Andrei Lutai 

Russian male single skaters
1986 births
Living people
People from Belgorod
Russian emigrants to Bulgaria
Competitors at the 2005 Winter Universiade
Sportspeople from Belgorod Oblast